Angelo Corrao is an Italian-American film and television editor. Born in Sicily, Corrao moved to New York City as a child with his family during World War II. He developed an interest in film editing after majoring in theater at Queens College. He is a member of American Cinema Editors. Corrao won a CINE Golden Eagle for his work on The Line King (1996) and was later nominated for an Eddie Award for his work on Bruce Weber's Chop Suey (2001).

Selected filmography

Citations

References

External links
 

American film editors
American Cinema Editors
Italian emigrants to the United States
Queens College, City University of New York alumni
American television editors